This is the discography of Scottish singer, songwriter and guitarist Donovan.

Discography

Studio albums

Live albums

Compilation albums
 The Real Donovan [U.S.] (1966) No. 96 U.S.
 Universal Soldier [UK] (1967) No. 5 UK
 Like It Is, Was, and Evermore Shall Be [U.S.] (1968) No. 177 U.S.
 A Touch of Music a Touch of Donovan [West Germany] (1969)
 The World of Donovan [UK] (1969)
 Donovan's Greatest Hits (1969) No. 4 U.S. (US: Platinum)
 The Best of Donovan [U.S.] (1969) No. 135 U.S.
 Donovan P. Leitch [U.S.] (1970) No. 128 U.S.
 Catch the Wind [UK] (1971)
 Hear Me Now [U.S.] (1971) No. 215 U.S.
 Golden Hour of Donovan [UK] (1971)
 The World of Donovan [U.S.] (1972)
 Colours [UK] (1972)
 Early Treasures [U.S.] (1973)
 The Pye History of British Pop Music: Donovan [UK] (Pye 502, March 1975)
 The Pye History of British Pop Music: Donovan Vol. 2 [UK] (Pye 507, Feb 1976)
 Sunshine Superman / In Concert At The Anaheim Convention Center, double album [NL] (Epic EPC22016) (1975)
 Donovan File [UK] (1977)
 Star Discothek: Donovan [West Germany] (Pye 200 890-241) (circa 1978)
 Spotlight on Donovan (PRT Records, SPOT 1017, October 1981)
 The Best of Donovan double album, (CBS 2CSP 002, 1982, Australia)
 Minstrel Boy (1983)
 Catch the Wind [UK] (1986)
 Colours [UK] (1987)
 The Very Best of Donovan [Spain] (1988)
 Donovan's Greatest Hits and More (1989)
 The EP Collection (1990)
 The Collection (1990)
 Colours (1991)
 Troubadour: The Definitive Collection 1964–1976 (1992)
 The Early Years (1993)
 Sunshine Superman: 18 Songs of Love and Freedom (1993)
 Wonderful Music of Donovan (1993); [Portugal] (1996)
 Donovan in Concert (=Rising) (1994)
 Live (=Rising) [Germany] (1995)
 Universal Soldier (Spectrum Music, 1995, unrelated to the 1967 release)
 Definitive Collection [Austria] [Holland] (1995)
 Golden Hits (=Lady of the Stars) [Holland; U.S.] (1996)
 Peace and Love Songs [U.S.] (1996)
 Performance (=Rising) (1997)
 Greatest Hits: Acoustic Live (=Rising) (1997)
 Mellow (1997)
 Love Is Hot, Truth Is Molten [Australia] (1998)
 The Very Best of Donovan (=Rising) (1998)
 Cosmic Wheels (=Rising) (1998)
 Atlantis Calling (1999)
 Summer Day Reflection Songs (2000)
 Super Hits Hit collection (22 August 2000; Sony 61053)
 Catch the Wind (2000)
 Colours: Live in Concert (=Rising) (2001)
 The Very Best of Donovan [Germany] Hit collection 3 June 2002 (Sony/Epic 4625602)
 The Very Best of Donovan: The Early Years 23 July 2002 (Sanctuary 81184)
 Sunshine Superman: The Very Best of Donovan (2002)
 Atlantis (=Rising Again) [Holland] (2002)
 Storyteller (2003)
 Catch the Wind [UK] (2003)
 The Great Donovan (=Troubadour: The Definitive Collection 1964–1976) [Australia] (2003)
 The Essential Donovan [1-Disc Version] (2004)
 Live re-orchestred (2004) (3-CD set only from iTunes)
 Try for the Sun: The Journey of Donovan (2005 box set) (Legacy Recordings)
 The Best of Donovan Sunshine Superman (2006)
 Fairytales and Colours (2007)
 Playlist: The Very Best of Donovan (2008)
 The Essential Donovan [2-Disc Version, US] (2012)
 Breezes of Patchouli – His Studio Recordings 1966–1969 (2013 box set)
 Eco-Song (2019)
Lunarian (2021)

Tribute albums
 Donovan My Way (Vic Lewis and his Orchestra) (1968)
 The Les Williams Orchestra Plays the Songs of Donovan (1968)
 The Golden Songs of Donovan Johnny Arthy Orchestra
 Island of Circles (1992)
 A Gift from a Garden to a Flower: A Tribute to Donovan (2002)
 Gazing With Tranquility: A Tribute to Donovan (2015))

Singles

Notes

References

External links
 Donovan unofficial website
 

Discographies of British artists
Folk music discographies
Pop music discographies